Carlos Ignacio Fernández Lobbe (born 20 November 1974 in Buenos Aires) is a retired Argentine rugby union player. He last played with English side, Bath Rugby in the Aviva Premiership. He has also represented Argentina on numerous occasions, including at the 1999, 2003 and 2007 Rugby World Cups.

He previously played for Sale Sharks, Castres, Bordeaux and the Liceo Naval club, moving to Northampton Saints for the 2008–09 season, where he made his debut against Worcester Warriors. In the 2005–2006 season, Lobbe started the final as Sale Sharks won their first ever Premiership title.

He was also an exceptionable leader, captaining Northampton Saints throughout the 2008/2009 season due to injury to the then club captain, Bruce Reihana.

In September 2010, it was announced that Fernández Lobbe would come out of retirement to join Bath Rugby as injury cover for the remainder of the 2010/11 season.

His nickname is Nacho for his second name (Ignacio) and "El Queson" (Big cheese).
He has a daughter.

Notes

External links
 Carlos Ignacio Fernández Lobbe at official Argentine Rugby Union site
 Carlos Ignacio Fernandez Lobbe on salesharks.com
 Carlos Ignacio Fernandez Lobbe on rwc2003.irb.com
 Carlos Ignacio Fernandez Lobbe on ercrugby.com

1974 births
Rugby union players from Buenos Aires
Argentine rugby union players
Northampton Saints players
Sale Sharks players
Living people
Rugby union locks
Argentina international rugby union players
Argentina international rugby sevens players
CA Bordeaux-Bègles Gironde players